Andrew Crews (born 18 August 1973) is an Australian retired footballer who played as a goalkeeper. He played for a number of clubs in the National Soccer League. He represented Australia in beach soccer.

Playing career

Club
In September 1999, Crews moved from Sydney United to fellow National Soccer League club Parramatta Power.

Crews signed with A-League side Perth Glory in July 2006 after an injury to Jason Petkovic. He made his debut for the side in a 2006 A-League Pre-Season Challenge Cup loss to Sydney FC.

International
Crews was selected for Australia in beach soccer for the 2005 FIFA Beach Soccer World Cup, the inaugural edition of the tournament.

References

External links

1973 births
Living people
Association football goalkeepers
Beach soccer players
Australian soccer players
Blacktown City FC players
Sydney United 58 FC players
Parramatta Power players
Wollongong Wolves FC players
APIA Leichhardt FC players
St George FC players
Marconi Stallions FC players
Perth Glory FC players
National Soccer League (Australia) players